Eulithidium tessellatum is a species of sea snail, a marine gastropod mollusk in the family Phasianellidae.

Description
The shell size varies between 3 mm and 6 mm. The short and solid shell has an oval or ovate shape. The spire is conic. The apex is obtuse. The 4–5 smooth whorls are slightly convex, and rapidly increasing. The body whorl is large and obtusely angulate at the periphery. The sutures are lightly impressed. The oblique aperture is ovat. Its outer and inner margins are equally curved. The columella has a white callus. The umbilical region is excavated, and usually obviously perforated. The color of the shell is white, yellow or reddish, longitudinally clouded with white, red or brown. The color is sometimes broken into subsutural and peripheral series of flammules, encircled with close continuous narrow revolving obliquely descending, regularly spaced orange or red lines. This species and the Eulithidium affine (C. B. Adams, 1850) are very abundant in many West Indian localities. They are usually associated together. Fresh specimens of both exhibit microscopic revolving impressed striae.

Distribution
This species is distributed in abundant numbers in the Gulf of Mexico and in the Caribbean Sea and the Lesser Antilles

References

 Anton, H. E. 1838. Verzeichniss der Conchylien.  xvi + 110 pp
 d'Orbigny, A. 1842. Mollusques. Histoire Physique, Politique et Naturelle de l'île de Cuba 2: 1–112, pls. 10–21?. Arthus Bertrand: Paris
 Adams, C. B. 1850. Descriptions of supposed new species of marine shells, which inhabit Jamaica. Contributions to Conchology 4: 56–68.
 Krebs, H. J. 1864. The West Indian Marine Shells.  vi + 137 pp. W. Laubs widow & Chr. Jo/rgensen: Nykjo/bing, Falster.
 Rosenberg, G., F. Moretzsohn, and E. F. García. 2009. Gastropoda (Mollusca) of the Gulf of Mexico, Pp. 579–699 in Felder, D.L. and D.K. Camp (eds.), Gulf of Mexico–Origins, Waters, and Biota. Biodiversity. Texas A&M Press, College Station, Texas.

External links
 

Phasianellidae
Gastropods described in 1838